Symbescaline, or 3,5-diethoxy-4-methoxyphenethylamine, is a lesser-known psychedelic drug.  It is an isomer of asymbescaline. Symbescaline was first synthesized by Alexander Shulgin. In his book PiHKAL (Phenethylamines i Have Known And Loved), the dosage is listed as 240 mg, and the duration listed as unknown. Symbescaline causes few effects, which include alertness and a threshold. Very little data exists about the pharmacological properties, metabolism, and toxicity of symbescaline.

See also 

 Phenethylamine
 Psychedelics, dissociatives and deliriants
 Thiosymbescaline

External links 
 Symbescaline entry in PiHKAL
 Symbescaline entry in PiHKAL • info

Psychedelic phenethylamines
Phenol ethers
Methoxy compounds